Andrea Dupree is a senior astrophysicist at the Center for Astrophysics  Harvard & Smithsonian. She is a Past-President of the American Astronomical Society, and served as the associate director of the Center for Astrophysics  Harvard & Smithsonian. Dr. Dupree also served as Head of the Solar, Stellar and Planetary Sciences Division for a dozen years.

Early life 
Andrea Kundsin Dupree was born September 17, 1939 to parents Edwin and Ruth. She is the oldest sibling with a younger brother Dennis Edwin Kundsin.

Education and career 

Dupree attended Wellesley College and graduated with her bachelor's degree in Liberal Arts in 1956. She knew she wanted to go in to the sciences, and her favorite subjects were Geology and Astronomy. In a 2007 interview, Dupree said, "I’m sure I would’ve been a geologist if the coin had ended up heads instead of tails." After graduating from Wellesley, Dupree briefly studied at University of California, Berkeley, before enrolling in graduate school at Radcliffe in 1961. The Radcliffe Graduate School merged with Harvard University in 1963, and Dupree graduated with her PhD in astrophysics from Harvard in 1968. Her graduate thesis was titled Analysis of Emission Lines from the Solar Corona.

Dupree has worked as an astrophysicist at the Center for Astrophysics  Harvard & Smithsonian since 1968. In 1980, she became the first woman and youngest person to serve as the associate director of the Center for Astrophysics. From 1996 to 1998, she served as the President of the American Astronomical Society. Dupree is an internationally recognized leader in stellar physics and the bulk of her research is on stars like our own Sun.

Dupree recorded an oral history with the American Institute of Physics (AIP) in 2007.

She was elected a Legacy Fellow of the American Astronomical Society in 2020

Awards And Honors 
She received the Smithsonian Scholarly Studies Award in 2019 and 2020.

References

External links 

 Oral history interview transcript with Andrea Dupree on 29 October 2007, American Institute of Physics, Niels Bohr Library & Archives

1939 births
Living people
American astrophysicists
Women astrophysicists
21st-century American women scientists
Harvard Graduate School of Arts and Sciences alumni
Fellows of the American Astronomical Society